César Soriano Ferrero (born 22 April 1983) is a Spanish professional footballer who plays as a left back.

Club career
Born in Ontinyent, Valencian Community, Soriano finished his youth career at Valencia CF, and made his senior debuts with the reserves in the third division. On 21 June 2003 he played his first and only La Liga game with the first team, coming on as a second-half substitute in a 3–0 away win against Sevilla FC.

Released by the Che in summer 2004, Soriano went on to spend seven of the following eight seasons in the third level, with CD Castellón, CD Leganés, Ontinyent CF and CF Badalona. On 4 July 2012, he moved to division two side CD Guadalajara.

Soriano appeared in his first official match for his new club on 19 August 2012, playing the full 90 minutes in a 1–1 draw at AD Alcorcón. On 7 April of the following year he scored his first and only goal as a professional, contributing to a 3–1 home success over Córdoba CF.

On 2 March 2014, Soriano signed for Real Avilés until the end of the season. After impressing, he moved to CD Leganés from the second tier on 2 July.

On 16 June 2015, Soriano agreed to a new one-year contract at the Estadio Municipal de Butarque. He contributed with 22 appearances during the campaign, as the team from the Madrid outskirts achieved promotion to the top flight for the first time ever.

On 7 July 2016, 33-year-old Soriano signed a one-year deal with SD Huesca as a free agent. A year later, he moved to fellow second tier club AD Alcorcón also on a one-year contract.

On 23 July 2018, Soriano joined third-tier club Lleida Esportiu on a two-year deal.

References

External links

1983 births
Living people
People from Vall d'Albaida
Sportspeople from the Province of Valencia
Spanish footballers
Footballers from the Valencian Community
Association football defenders
La Liga players
Segunda División players
Segunda División B players
Tercera División players
Valencia CF Mestalla footballers
Valencia CF players
CD Castellón footballers
CD Leganés players
Ontinyent CF players
CF Badalona players
CD Guadalajara (Spain) footballers
Real Avilés CF footballers
SD Huesca footballers
AD Alcorcón footballers
Lleida Esportiu footballers